Stickford is a village and civil parish in the East Lindsey district of Lincolnshire, England.

Stickford is first recorded in the Domesday Book of 1086, where it appears as Stichesforde, meaning 'stick ford' (cf. the nearby Stickney).

Stickford church is dedicated to Saint Helen and is a Grade II* listed building. It dates from the 13th century although it has been much restored.

Stickford County Primary School finally closed in 1987. It had opened as a National School in 1846, and was a Board School between 1872 and 1903 when those were abolished.

Shaws Windmill is a three-storey red-brick tower mill dating from 1820, which ceased working in 1952, and is now Grade II listed.

References

External links 

 "Stickford", Genuki.org.uk
 Listed buildings in Stickford

East Lindsey District
Villages in Lincolnshire
Civil parishes in Lincolnshire
Windmills in Lincolnshire